The following is a list of Teen Choice Award winners and nominees for Choice TV – Reality Series. American Idol and Keeping Up with the Kardashians receives the most wins with 4.

Winners and nominees

2000s

2010s

References

Reality Series